Rozelieures is a commune in the Meurthe-et-Moselle department in north-eastern France. It is known as the namesake of Rozelieurs whisky.

See also
Communes of the Meurthe-et-Moselle department

References

Communes of Meurthe-et-Moselle